The Helena Brewers were a Minor League Baseball team in the Pioneer League located in Helena, Montana, from 1978 to 2018. The team played their home games at Kindrick Legion Field, which was built in 1939. They were affiliated with the Milwaukee Brewers (1985–2000, 2003–2018) and Philadelphia Phillies (1978–1983).

Among the best-known players to play in Helena are Hall of Famer Ryne Sandberg, who started his career with the Phillies in Helena, Gary Sheffield, who started his career with the Helena Gold Sox in 1986, Jeff Cirillo and Mark Loretta who began their careers with the 1991 and 1993 Helena Brewers, respectively; and Milwaukee Brewers outfielder Ryan Braun.

History
The Helena Phillies joined the Pioneer League in 1978, giving Helena a professional baseball team for the first time in 64 years. In 1984, the Helena Gold Sox won the Pioneer League Championship, a rarity for an independent club. The team hooked on with the Milwaukee Brewers in 1985 and changed its name to the Helena Brewers in 1987. Helena won the league championship in back-to-back seasons in 1995 and 1996. The franchise moved to Provo, Utah, as the Provo Angels after the 2000 season. In 2003, the Medicine Hat Blue Jays moved to Helena, and the team once again became a Brewers affiliate. 

The franchise left Helena for Colorado Springs, Colorado, after the 2018 season, where it would play as the Rocky Mountain Vibes.

Season-by-season record

Major leaguers
The following is a list of Helena players by year that later played in Major League Baseball:
 1978: George Bell, Carmelo Castillo, Wil Culmer, Bob Dernier, Ed Hearn, Alejandro Sánchez, Ryne Sandberg
 1979: Jay Baller, Roy Smith
 1980: Rocky Childress, Darren Daulton, Marty Decker, Ken Dowell, Tony Ghelfi
 1981: Johnny Abrego, Charles Hudson, Jim Olander, Jose Segura
 1982: Ken Jackson, Lance McCullers, Johnny Paredes, Wilfredo Tejada
 1983: Ricky Jordan, Tom Magrann, Tom Newell  
 1984: Jack Daugherty, John Trautwein
 1985: John Jaha, Russ McGinnis, Randy Veres
 1986: George Canale, Brian Drahman, Darryl Hamilton, Gary Sheffield,      Greg Vaughn
 1987: Frank Bolick, Oreste Marrero, Ángel Miranda, Charlie Montoyo, Jaime Navarro, Dave Nilsson, Troy O'Leary, Steve Sparks, Bill Spiers
 1988: Bert Heffernan, Mike Ignasiak, Mark Kiefer
 1991: Jeff Cirillo, Mike Matheny, Marshall Boze 
 1992: Bobby Hughes, Danny Perez, Tim Unroe;  Danan Hughes played minor league baseball for the 1992 and 1993 seasons in the Pioneer League for the Helena Brewers.  He decided to make football his full-time profession when the Kansas City Chiefs selected him in the 7th round of the 1993 NFL Draft.  Hughes played for the Chiefs from 1993 to 1998 as a wide receiver and special teams player.  
 1993: Brian Banks, Todd Dunn, Danny Klassen, Mark Loretta, Sean Maloney, Greg Martinez
 1994: Antone Williamson, Kelly Wunsch
 1995: Robinson Cancel, Geoff Jenkins, Mike Kinkade, Mickey Lopez, Greg Mullins
 1996: Allen Levrault, Mark Watson
 1997: Jason Childers, Brian Mallette
 1998: Matt Childers, Bill Hall, Luis Martinez
 2003: Drew Anderson, Carlos Corporán, Tim Dillard, Dana Eveland, Vinny Rottino, Mitch Stetter, Ty Taubenheim
 2004: Alcides Escobar
 2005: Michael Brantley, Ryan Braun, Lorenzo Cain, Darren Ford, Matt Gamel, Ángel Salomé, Joe Thatcher
 2006: Zach Braddock, Cole Gillespie, Taylor Green, Mike McClendon
 2007: Dane De La Rosa, Eric Farris, Eric Fryer, Caleb Gindl, Donovan Hand, Matt LaPorta, Jonathan Lucroy, Zelous Wheeler
 2008: Erik Komatsu, Lucas Luetge, Wily Peralta, Logan Schafer, Rob Wooten
 2009: Chris Capuano, Khristopher Davis, Michael Fiers, Sean Halton, Jake Odorizzi, Josh Prince
 2010: Hiram Burgos, Jimmy Nelson, Caleb Thielbar, Tyler Thornburg 
 2011: Tyler Cravy, David Goforth, Yadiel Rivera, Jason Rodgers
 2012: Michael Reed, Tyler Wagner

References

External links
 Official Helena Brewers website
 Helena Brewers statistics at The Baseball Cube
 Ballpark Digest – Helena Brewers

Defunct Pioneer League (baseball) teams
Baseball teams established in 1978
Sports clubs disestablished in 2000
Baseball teams established in 2003
Baseball teams disestablished in 2018
Helena, Montana
Professional baseball teams in Montana
Milwaukee Brewers minor league affiliates
Philadelphia Phillies minor league affiliates
1978 establishments in Montana
2000 disestablishments in Montana
2003 establishments in Montana
2018 disestablishments in Montana
Defunct baseball teams in Montana